Heghine Rapyan (born April 24, 1985 in Gavar, Armenia) is a pianist of Armenian origin.
She is an honours graduate (diploma with distinction) of the “Komitas” State Conservatory, Yerevan, Armenia. In 2008 she was offered a place for Postgraduate study in “Mozarteum” University in Salzburg / Austria, where she studied under the guidance of Prof. Peter Lang and latterly Prof. Rolf Plagge. In addition, since 2011, Heghine is researching on the biography of an unknown Austrian woman composer of the late 19th / early 20th century.

She has participated in Masterclasses of Alexander Banduryansky, Jerome Rose, Jura Margulis, Robert Levin, Klauss Hellwig, Ludmil Angelov and Arnulf von Arnim.

Heghine Rapyan has given recitals since 2001 in the Netherlands, Germany, Austria, Italy, Greece, Russia, Armenia and Saudi Arabia and performed as a soloist with the Armenian Philharmonic Orchestra and Armenian National Chamber Orchestra.

She is an award winner of national and international piano competitions in Armenia, Moldavia, Greece and Italy. She is a recipient of  the special prize of Kawai “most promising talent”  and has received study scholarships.

Notes

References

 
 
 
 
 

Living people
Armenian pianists
Armenian women pianists
1985 births
21st-century pianists
21st-century women pianists